Talipan National High School (formerly known as Talipan Barangay High School) is a public high school founded in 1973 and located in Pagbilao, Quezon, Philippines. It caters for more than 2,000 students and more than 500 students graduate annually. Grade levels are 7 to 12

The school's first principal was Reynaldo Ladlad who was succeeded by Virginia M. Magbuhos .

High schools in Quezon